H. S. Barney Building is a historic department store complex located at Schenectady in Schenectady County, New York. The large commercial building consists of six sections constructed or acquired and linked between 1873 and 1923. It is predominantly brick in construction, but incorporates heavy timber framing, concrete, and limestone. A facade erected in 1923 in the Commercial style, helped to unify the complex. It ceased use as a department store in 1973.

It was added to the National Register of Historic Places on July 19, 1984.

References

Commercial buildings on the National Register of Historic Places in New York (state)
Commercial buildings completed in 1873
Buildings and structures in Schenectady County, New York
Department stores on the National Register of Historic Places
National Register of Historic Places in Schenectady County, New York